Standing Tall is the debut studio album by former Hear'Say singer Kym Marsh. It was released on 21 July 2003 in the United Kingdom by Island Records.

The album was preceded by two single releases: "Cry", the lead single, and "Come on Over" which reached number 2 and 10 respectively on the UK Singles Chart. Standing Tall peaked at number 9 on the UK Albums Chart after selling 19,821 copies in the first week. Marsh's third single, "Sentimental", was released in October 2003 and stalled at number 35 resulting in her being dropped by the record label.

Track listing

Charts

References

2003 debut albums
Island Records albums
Kym Marsh albums